Plog may refer to:

 Anthony Plog (born 1947), American conductor
 Jobst Plog, director (1991–2008) of the broadcaster Norddeutscher Rundfunk
 Stephen Plog (fl. 1980–1997), American archaeologist and anthropologist
 Plog Island, an Antarctic island in Prydz Bay
 A verb for the noun plogging which is jogging and picking up litter
 LifeType, a blogging platform, originally developed under the name pLog
 plog, a Unix command related to the Point-to-Point Protocol daemon
 Plog, a photo delivery system worked on by scientist Rich Gossweiler
 Plough, in Swedish and Norwegian